In Conspectu Divinae Majestatis is an EP by De Magia Veterum, independently released on September 1, 2010. The tracks were originally recorded with the intention of being placed on a split release alongside another band's work.

Track listing

Personnel
Adapted from In Conspectu Divinae Majestatis liner notes.
 Maurice de Jong (as Mories) – vocals, instruments, recording, cover art

Release history

References

External links 
 
 In Conspectu Divinae Majestatis at Bandcamp

2010 EPs
De Magia Veterum albums